King Water is a river in the north of Cumbria, England. The Brampton Angling Association has a long term let from the Earl of Carlisle for fishing rights on a portion of the River Irthing and part of the King Water.  Hadrian's Wall crossed the King Water to the east of the village of Walton

References

Rivers of Cumbria
2King